Nikki Alexia-China Merritt (born February 9, 1972) is a Democratic politician.
She was elected to become a member of the Georgia State Senate,
representing the 9th District, on November 3, 2020. Merritt defeated Republican P. K. Martin IV for the seat.

References

External links
 Profile at the Georgia State Senate
 Official website

Living people
Georgia (U.S. state) Democrats
Georgia State University alumni
21st-century American politicians
21st-century American women politicians
Women state legislators in Georgia (U.S. state)
1972 births